New York’s 30th congressional district was a congressional district for the United States House of Representatives in New York.  It was eliminated as a result of the 2000 U.S. Census. It was last represented by Jack Quinn who was redistricted into the 27th district.

The 30th congressional district is also referred to in the NBC television series Heroes, as the fictional district represented by Nathan Petrelli.

Voting

Past components
1993–2003: 
Parts of Erie
1983–1993: 
All of Genesee
Parts of Livingston, Monroe, Ontario
1973–1983:
All of Clinton, Franklin, Jefferson, Lewis, St. Lawrence
Parts of Essex, Oswego
1971–1973:
All of Rensselaer, Saratoga, Warren, Washington
Parts of Albany, Essex
1969–1971:
All of Essex, Fulton, Hamilton, Rensselaer, Saratoga, Warren, Washington
1963–1969:
All of Clinton, Essex, Fulton, Hamilton, Saratoga, Warren, Washington
Parts of Rensselaer
1953–1963:
All of Albany
Parts of Rensselaer
1945–1953:
All of Columbia, Dutchess, Greene, Schoharie, Ulster
1913–1945:
All of Fulton, Hamilton, Montgomery, Schenectady
1903–1913:
All of Broome, Chenango, Cortland, Tioga, Tompkins
1893–1903:
All of Genesee, Livingston, Niagara, Orleans, Wyoming

List of members representing the district

Election results 
Note that in New York State electoral politics there are numerous minor parties at various points on the political spectrum. Certain parties will invariably endorse either the Republican or Democratic candidate for every office, hence the state electoral results contain both the party votes, and the final candidate votes (Listed as "Recap").

References 

 Congressional Biographical Directory of the United States 1774–present
 2000 House election data Clerk of the House of Representatives
 1998 House election data
 1996 House election data

30
Former congressional districts of the United States
Constituencies established in 1823
Constituencies disestablished in 2003
1823 establishments in New York (state)
2003 disestablishments in New York (state)